Something to Crow About is the second album by punk rock band The Riverboat Gamblers, released in 2003.

Track listing 
"Let's Eat"
"What's What"
"Rattle Me Bones"
"Hey! Hey! Hey!"
"Save You"
"Sparks & Shots"
"Ice Water"
"Ooh Yeah"
"Dead from the Neck Up"
"Catch Your Eye"
"Cut-Cut-Cut-Cut"
"Last to Know"
"Lottie Mae"

Personnel 
The Riverboat Gamblers
 Mike "Teko" Wiebe – Vocals
 Freddy Castro – Guitar, vocals
 Colin Ambulance – Guitar, vocals
 Patrick Lillard – Bass guitar
 Jessie 3X – Drums, vocals

Artwork
 Jeremy Stoner – Layout and design
 Ike Taylor – Live photos
 Kris Pierce – Chicken eatin' photo

Production
 Tim Kerr – Producer
 Mike Vasquez – mixing
 John Golden – Mastering

Management
 Todd Cote – Booking Agent for Leafy Green

References

2003 albums
The Riverboat Gamblers albums